Kamran Lashari is a retired Pakistani civil servant of the Pakistan Administrative Service who served in BPS-22 grade as the Petroleum Secretary of Pakistan and Chief Secretary Sindh. Lashari is best known for his five-year stint as chairman of the Capital Development Authority during the government of President Pervez Musharraf. After retirement from active civil service, Lashari remained president of the Lahore Gymkhana and director general of the Walled City of Lahore Authority.

Family
Lashari is father of film director Bilal Lashari. He also featured in Waar, a movie directed by his son in 2013. In the movie, Lashari played the role of Asher Azeem, DG of Pakistan's Internal Security.

Career

Lashari served as the Petroleum Secretary of Pakistan and Chief Secretary Sindh. Other assignments he held include Federal Secretary for Environment and  chairman of the Capital Development Authority (CDA). He was brought in CDA by then Interior Minister Faisal Saleh Hayat. He is widely regarded as the most successful chairman in CDA's history. He served as chairman CDA for five years and became an aide of President Pervez Musharraf.

In the initial stages of his career, he served as assistant commissioner of Umerkot and deputy commissioner of Karachi and Sukkur. He also served in Punjab as deputy commissioner in many districts.

See also
Nasir Mahmood Khosa
Tariq Bajwa
Fawad Hassan Fawad
Rizwan Ahmed
Jawad Rafique Malik
Hussain Asghar

References

Year of birth missing (living people)
Living people
Pakistani civil servants
Government of Pakistan
Pakistani government officials